Michael Härtel (born 25 January 1998) is a German speedway, grasstrack and longtrack rider, who finished runner-up in the 2017 Longtrack World Championship.

Biography
Michael Härtel was born in Landshut, Germany and has been competing in the World Longtrack Championship since 2015. In his first appearance he came third and his second saw his win a Vechta.

World Longtrack Championship
In 2017 Härtel became a full competitor in the championship and took second overall. During the campaign he was third at Herxheim and Morizes, runner-up at La Reole and winner at Mühldorf.

Overall
 2014 N/S Reserve
 2015 - 2 apps (9th) 36pts
 2016 - 1 apps (18th) 7pts
 2017 - 5 apps (Runner-up) 101pts

Best Grand-Prix Results
  Herxheim Third 2015 & 2017
  La Reole Second 2017
  Morizes Third 2017
  Mühldorf First 2017
  Vechta First 2015

Team Championship
 2015  Mühldorf (Runners-up) 44pts (Rode with Jorg Tebbe, Stephan Katt, Erik Riss)
 2016  Marianske Lazne (Runners-up) 44pts (Rode with Martin Smolinski, Jorg Tebbe, Stephan Katt)

Speedway
Härtel has represented the German Under 21 team and has helped them to the 2017 European Championship finals in Poland. He has been the Germany Under 21 Champion on three occasions, in 2013, 2014 and 2015.

External links

Website

References

1998 births
German speedway riders
Living people
Place of birth missing (living people)
Individual Speedway Long Track World Championship riders
Sportspeople from Landshut